Chelidoperca, commonly known as perchlet, is a genus of marine ray-finned fishes which is a member of the subfamily Serraninae of the family Serranidae, which includes the groupers and anthias. They are found in the Indo-Pacific region.

Species
There are currently 19 recognized species in this genus:
 Chelidoperca africana Cadenat, 1960 (African perchlet)
 Chelidoperca barazeri S.-H. Lee, M.-Y. Lee, Matsunuma and Chen, 2019 (Barazer's perchlet)
 Chelidoperca cerasina Ogino, S.-H. Lee, Chen & Matsunuma, 2019 (Cherry perchlet)
 Chelidoperca flavimacula Psomadakis, Gon & Htut, 2021 (Yellow-spotted perchlet)
 Chelidoperca flavolineata Matsunuma, Tan & Peristiwady, 2020 (Yellow-banded perchlet)
 Chelidoperca formosa Tang & Ho, 2021 (Taiwanese perchlet)
 Chelidoperca hirundinacea (Valenciennes, 1831)
 Chelidoperca investigatoris (Alcock, 1890) 
 Chelidoperca lecromi Fourmanoir, 1982
 Chelidoperca leucostigmata S.-H. Lee, M.-Y. Lee, Matsunuma & Chen, 2019 (White-spotted perchlet)
 Chelidoperca maculicauda Bineesh & Akhilesh, 2013 (Indian perchlet) 
 Chelidoperca margaritifera M. C. W. Weber, 1913 (Pearly perchlet)
 Chelidoperca microdon S.-H. Lee, M.-Y. Lee, Matsunuma & Chen, 2019 (Small-toothed perchlet)
 Chelidoperca myathantuni Psomadakis, Gon & Htut, 2021 (Mya Than Tun’s perchlet)
 Chelidoperca occipitalis Kotthaus, 1973 (Arabian perchlet) 
 Chelidoperca pleurospilus (Günther, 1880)
 Chelidoperca santosi J. T. Williams & K. E. Carpenter, 2015 (Pogi perchlet) 
 Chelidoperca stella Matsunuma & Motomura, 2016 
 Chelidoperca tosaensis Matsunuma, Yamakawa & J.T. Williams, 2017 (Red-spot perchlet)

References

Serraninae